The Charles H. Burgess House is a historic house at 17 Whitney Road in Quincy, Massachusetts.  The -story wood-frame house was built c. 1903 by Charles H. Burgess, a real estate developer and auction-house owner.  The house exhibits both Queen Anne and Shingle styling, with Queen Anne-like projecting corner bay, and a wraparound porch supported by paired columns.  Decorative cut shingles make a string course under a slight flare at the base of the second floor.

The house was listed on the National Register of Historic Places in 1989.

See also
National Register of Historic Places listings in Quincy, Massachusetts

References

Houses in Quincy, Massachusetts
Queen Anne architecture in Massachusetts
Houses completed in 1903
Shingle Style houses
National Register of Historic Places in Quincy, Massachusetts
Houses on the National Register of Historic Places in Norfolk County, Massachusetts
Shingle Style architecture in Massachusetts